Marple is a town in the Metropolitan Borough of Stockport, Greater Manchester, England. The town, together with the villages of High Lane, Marple Bridge, Mellor, and Strines, and the surrounding countryside, contains 141 listed buildings that are recorded in the National Heritage List for England. Of these, one is listed at Grade I, the highest of the three grades, three are at Grade II*, the middle grade, and the others are at Grade II, the lowest grade.

The area was mainly rural until the Industrial Revolution brought the textile industry to the region towards the end of the 18th century. The listed buildings dating from before that time are mainly houses and associated structures, farmhouses and farm buildings, together with a church and a bridge. The Peak Forest Canal and the Macclesfield Canal were built through the area, making a junction in Marple. A considerable number of structures associated with the canals are listed, including bridges, a flight of 16 locks, aqueducts, lock keepers' cottages, warehouses, and milestones. The Manchester, Sheffield and Lincolnshire Railway was also built to run through the area, and two of its viaducts are listed. The other listed buildings include a weir on the River Goyt, bridges, the remains of a limekiln, churches and items in churchyards, former toll houses, and war memorials.


Key

Buildings

Notes and references

Notes

Citations

Sources

Lists of listed buildings in Greater Manchester
Buildings and structures in the Metropolitan Borough of Stockport
Listed